Charity Shea (born December 4, 1983) is an American former actress. She is best known for her role as troubled teenager Samantha Best in The Best Years. She has starred in films including Alpha Dog with Justin Timberlake and Bruce Willis. She appears as "April" on the VH1 series Single Ladies a drama series, starring alongside Denise Vasi & LisaRaye McCoy.

Filmography

References

External links

Actresses from Denver
American film actresses
American television actresses
Living people
People from the Denver metropolitan area
1983 births
21st-century American women